The South African Medical Journal is a monthly peer-reviewed open-access medical journal which has been published in South Africa since 1884.  It is sponsored by the South African Medical Association and published by the association's publishing arm, the Health & Medical Publishing Group. Daniel Ncayiyana was the journal's first black editor-in-chief.

Abstracting and indexing 
The journal is abstracted and indexed in BIOSIS Previews, Current Contents/Clinical Medicine, PubMed/MEDLINE, and the Science Citation Index. According to the Journal Citation Reports, the journal's 2009 impact factor is 1.325, ranking it 65th out of 133 journals in the category "Medicine, General & Internal".

International affairs
In 1933, following the rise of the Nazi Party in Germany, a correspondent for the journal reported on the systematic oppression of Jewish medical professionals in Germany. These actions included denial of graduations for Jewish medical students, employment bans, forced resignations, raids on a Jewish medical association, and violent attacks on individual doctors. The report concluded that the actions of the Nazi regime likely had the tacit support of the German medical establishment and ended with the request that South African doctors protest the actions.

See also
 Open access in South Africa

References

External links
 

General medical journals
Publications established in 1884
Monthly journals
English-language journals
Creative Commons-licensed journals
Academic journals published in South Africa